Giovan Francesco Capoferri (1487–1534) was an intarsia artist in Bergamo, Lombardy (at the time a city of the Republic of Venice).

He was schooled by Damiano da Bergamo, working on the intarsia in the choir of Santi Bartolomeo e Stefano, Bergamo during the 1510s.

In the 1520s, Capoferri worked based on designs by the painter Lorenzo Lotto, notably working on the choir of Santa Maria Maggiore, Bergamo.

Notable works: 
The drowning of the Pharaoh (1529-30),
Judith and Holofernes (1527-30),
The death of Abel (1524)
Noah's Ark (1525),
The jealousy of Noah (1524),
Jonah (1528-30)

References
Francesca Cortesi Bosco, Il coro intarsiato di Lotto e Capoferri per Santa Maria Maggiore in Bergamo (1987).

1487 births
1534 deaths
16th-century Italian artists